Ruído Rosa is the sixth album of the Brazilian rock band Pato Fu.

Track listing 

 Eu (I)
 Ninguém (Nobody)
 Day After Day
 Tribunal de Causas Realmente Pequenas (Really Small Claims Court)
 Menti Pra Você, Mas Foi Sem Querer (I Lied to You, But I Didn't Mean to)
 Ruído Rosa (Pink Noise)
 Deus (God)
 2 Malucos (2 Nutjobs)
 Tolices (Foolish Things)
 Que Fragilidade (Such Fragility)
 E O Vento Levou... (Gone with the Wind...)
 Sorria, Você Está Sendo Filmado (Smile, You're on Camera)
 Ando Meio Desligado (I Feel a Little Spaced Out) (Os Mutantes cover)

Personnel
Pato Fu
 Fernanda Takai –  lead  (all but 12) and background vocals (1, 3, 6, 12), acoustic and electric guitars; harmonica (11)
 John Ulhoa – vocals (5, 7, 8, 9 and 10; lead on "Sorria. Você Está Sendo Filmado"), electric and acoustic guitars, keyboards, programming; synth and theremin (1), electronic bass (4, 9), toy piano (9); post-production, recording (at home)
 Ricardo Koctus – bass, background vocals
 Xande Tamietti – drums; background vocals (5), pandeiro (8), loops (11)

Additional musicians
 Dudu Marote - electronic bass (1), Fender Rhodes piano (6)
 André Abujamra (Os Mulheres Negras) - vocals and electric guitar on "Day After Day"
 Maurício Pereira - vocals, soprano and tenor saxophone on "Day After Day"

Production
 Dudu Marote - production
 Clive Goddard - mixing at Strongroom, London  (all except 3, 4, 6, 10 and 13)
 Rogério Pereira - mixing at Dr. Dd Eletromúsica, São Paulo (3, 4, 6, 10 and 13), recording at Dr. Dd Eletromúsica
 Stuart Hawkes - mastering at Metropolis, London
 Parick McGovern - studio assistant at Strongroom
 Carlos Blau - studio assistant at Dr. Dd

2001 albums
Pato Fu albums